Hîrcești is a commune in Ungheni District, Moldova. It is composed of five villages: Drujba, Hîrcești, Leordoaia, Mînzătești and Veverița.

References

Communes of Ungheni District